Subait Khater Fayel Khamis Al-Mukhaini (born on February 27, 1980) is a retired Emirati footballer who played as a midfielder for Al Ain FC, Al-Jazira Club and the United Arab Emirates national football team. He is the father of the Al Jazira player Hazza Subait.

Club Statistics

Club

International goals

Honours

Club
Al Jazira
UAE Pro League: 2010–11
UAE President's Cup: 2010–11, 2011–12
UAE League Cup: 2009–10
Al Ain
UAE Pro League: 1997–98, 1999–00, 2001–02, 2002–03, 2003–04
UAE President's Cup: 1998–99, 2000–01, 2004–05, 2005–06
UAE Super Cup: 2003
UAE Federation Cup: 2004–05, 2005–06
GCC Champions League: 2001
AFC Champions League: 2002–03

Individual
 Emirati Player of the Year: 2000–01 2004–05

See also
List of men's footballers with 100 or more international caps

References

External links

Subait Khater at UAEProLeague

1980 births
Living people
People from Al Ain
Emirati footballers
Association football midfielders
United Arab Emirates international footballers
Al Ain FC players
2004 AFC Asian Cup players
2011 AFC Asian Cup players
Al Jazira Club players
Fujairah FC players
FIFA Century Club
Footballers at the 2002 Asian Games
UAE Pro League players
Asian Games competitors for the United Arab Emirates